David Hernández de la Fuente (born 1974 in Madrid) is a Spanish writer, translator and university lecturer who is specialized in Classics.

Biography 

Hernández de la Fuente was born in Madrid in 1974 and he studied at the Complutense University of Madrid. He obtained university degrees in Classics, Spanish Philology and Law from Madrid University and a PhD in Classics (2005), supervised by Carlos García Gual, and Sociology (2011), supervised by Antonio López Peláez and Sagrario Segado Sánchez-Cabezudo. After the completion of his PhD, he has been lecturer of Classical Studies at the Charles III University of Madrid, Fellow of the Humboldt Foundation at the Chair of Ancient History of the University of Potsdam and Professor at the Department of Ancient History at the Spanish National University of Distance Education (UNED). He has been visiting scholar at several European and American universities, such as Columbia University, University of Florence, Paris West University Nanterre La Défense or Free University of Berlin.

Currently, he is a Faculty Member of the Department of Classics at the Complutense University of Madrid.

Fiction writing 

David Hernández de la Fuente started his career as fiction writer in 2004 with the book Las puertas del sueño (Madrid, 2005), which was awarded the VIII Young Artists Prize of the Community of Madrid (Spanish Wikipedia) and he has published ever since novels and short stories in literary journals (Barcelona Review, Cuadernos del Matemático) and anthologies (Inmenso estrecho, etc.). His experimental novel Continental (2007) was acclaimed by the critic as the work of "one of the most vigorous representatives of the New Spanish Narrative." He has been awarded the prestigious Valencia Prize for Narrative (Institució Alfons el Magnànim (Spanish Wikipedia), Diputación de Valencia (Spanish Wikipedia)) for his novel A cubierto (Madrid, 2011). Further on he has published the fictional travel diary s/t, and the novels La caverna de las cigarras, El retorno de los Heraclidas and El origen del vellocino de oro .

Essays and non-fiction 

Hernández de la Fuente has authored several books on Classics and the Ancient World such as Oráculos griegos (2008), De Galatea a Barbie (2010), Las máscaras del hidalgo (2010), Vidas de Pitágoras (2011), Breve historia de Bizancio (2011) Historia del pensamiento político griego (2014) or Civilización Griega (2014) among others. He has won unanimous praise from both the public and the critics for his non-fiction writing on Classical Literature and its reception in the modern world. His popular monograph on Pythagoras, with two editions, has been appointed "Book of the Year" by the cultural supplement of El País. His last essay on Dionysos and Ariadne El despertar del alma (2017) has also won praise from both scholars and literary critics.   
Moreover, he has edited collective monographs such as New Perspectives on Late Antiquity (2011) or The Theodosian Age (AD 379–455): Power, Place, Belief and Learning at the End of the Western Empire (2013) and authored numerous scientific articles in peer-reviewed journals. Hernández de la Fuente has edited, translated into Spanish and commented Classical authors such as Nonnus of Panopolis, Plutarch, Plato or Pindar.

Literary criticism 

He regularly collaborates in several journals of literature, history and literary criticism (Cuadernos Hispanoamericanos, Revista de Libros, etc.) and in daily newspapers such as La Razón. Hernández de la Fuente has authored numerous articles of popular science regarding the Ancient World and he is advisor for Classical Antiquity at the magazine Historia National Geographic (Spanish Wikipedia).

Awards and fellowships 

 Prize for Young Narrative. Community of Madrid (2004) for the book Las puertas del sueño.
 Prize of the Pastor Foundation for Classical Studies (2005)
 Fellowship of the Humboldt Foundation (2009)
 "Valencia" Prize for Narrative. Institució Alfons el Magnànim (Province of Valencia (2010) for the book A cubierto.
 Vidas de Pitágoras: Book of the Year (Biographies) in El País (2011)
 Burgen Scholarship Award 2014. Academia Europaea

Works

Fiction 
 El origen del vellocino de oro (Mitología. Gredos-RBA, Barcelona 2017). .
 El regreso de los Heraclidas (Mitología. Gredos-RBA, Barcelona 2017). . 
 La caverna de las cigarras (Literaturas Com Libros, Madrid 2011). .
 s/t (s/t, Berlin 2011). .
 A cubierto (Nowtilus, Madrid 2011). . 
 Continental (Kailas, Madrid 2007). .
 'El último dálmata' in Inmenso estrecho.
 Las puertas del sueño (Kailas, Madrid, 2005). . Second edition (Musa a las 9, Madrid 2011 ).

Non-fiction 
 El despertar del alma. Dioniso y Ariadna: Mito y Misterio, (Editorial Ariel, Barcelona 2017). .
 Breve historia política del mundo clásico (with Pedro Barceló), (Escolar y Mayo editores, Madrid 2017). .
 De ὅρος a limes: el concepto de frontera en el mundo antiguo y su recepción (edited with Marco Alviz Fernández), (Escolar y Mayo editores, Madrid 2017). .
 De Orfeo a David Lynch: Mito, Simbolismo y Recepción. Ensayos y ficciones (edited with Fernando Broncano), (Escolar y Mayo editores, Madrid  2015). .
 Mitología clásica (Alianza Editorial, Madrid 2015). .
 El mito de Orfeo. Motivos, símbolos y tradición literaria (with Carlos García Gual), (Fondo de Cultura Económica, Madrid 2014). .
 New Perspectives on Late Antiquity in the Eastern Roman Empire (edited with Ana de Francisco Heredero and Susana Torres Prieto), (Cambridge Scholars Publishing, Newcastle 2014). .
 Historia del pensamiento político griego: teoría y praxis (with Pedro Barceló), (Editorial Trotta, Madrid 2014). .
 Civilización Griega (con Raquel López Melero), (Alianza Editorial, Madrid 2014). .
 Breve Historia de Bizancio (Alianza Editorial, Madrid 2014). .
 El espejismo del bárbaro. Ciudadanos y extranjeros al final de la Antigüedad (edited with David Álvarez Jiménez and Rosa Sanz Serrano), (Biblioteca Potestas, n.1, Universitat Jaume I, Castellón 2013).  
 The Theodosian Age (AD 379–455): Power, Place, Belief and Learning at the End of the Western Empire (edited with Rosa García-Gasco and Sergio González Sánchez), (Archaeopress, Oxford 2013). 
 De Prometeo a Frankenstein: autómatas, ciborgs y otras creaciones más que humanas (edited with Fernando Broncano), (Ediciones Evohé, Madrid  2012). .
 Vidas de Pitágoras (Ediciones Atalanta, Vilaür 2011). . Revised second edition (Ediciones Atalanta, Vilaür 2014. .).
 New Perspectives on Late Antiquity (ed.), (Cambridge Scholars Publishing, Newcastle 2011). 
 Las máscaras del hidalgo (Delirio Ediciones, Salamanca 2010). 
 De Galatea a Barbie: Autómatas, robots y otras figuras de la construcción femenina (edited with Fernando Broncano), (Lengua de Trapo, Madrid  2010). 
 Bakkhos Anax. Un estudio sobre Nono de Panópolis (Nueva Roma, 30, CSIC, Madrid 2008).  
 Cuadernos del abismo: homenaje a H.P. Lovecraft (edited with Fernando Broncano), (Literaturas.Com Libros, Madrid 2008). . Revised second edition (Literaturas Com Libros, Madrid 2009).  
 Oráculos griegos (Alianza Editorial, Madrid 2008). 
 La mitología contada con sencillez (Maeva, Madrid, 2005). 
 Lovecraft. Una mitología (ELR, Madrid, 2004).

Translations 
 Pedro Barceló, Alejandro Magno, Alianza Editorial, Madrid, 2011. 
 Nonnus, Dionisíacas. Cantos XXXVII-XLVIII (Biblioteca Clásica Gredos, 370), Editorial Gredos, Madrid, 2008. 
 Plutarch, Vidas paralelas. Vol. V: Cimón-Lúculo (Biblioteca Clásica Gredos, 362), Editorial Gredos, Madrid, 2007. 
 Bryan Ward-Perkins, La caída de Roma y el fin de la civilización (trans. with Manuel Cuesta), Espasa Calpe, Madrid, 2007. 
 Nonnus, Dionisíacas. Cantos XXV-XXXVI (Biblioteca Clásica Gredos, 319), Editorial Gredos, Madrid, 2004. 
 Cantar de Ruodlieb, Celeste, Madrid 2002. . Revised second edition (Musa a las 9, Madrid 2010 )
 Nonnus, Dionisíacas. Cantos XIII-XXIV (Biblioteca Clásica Gredos, 286), Editorial Gredos, Madrid, 2001.

Notes

External links
Official Website
Profile at Academia.edu
 Profile at UNED
Bibliography at the Virtual International Authority File
Revista de Estudios Clásicos (Argentina). Review of Oráculos griegos
Interview on El País
Anales del Seminario de Historia de la Filosofía. Review of Vidas de Pitágoras
ABC (newspaper). Review of Vidas de Pitágoras

1974 births
Living people
Spanish male novelists
Hellenists
Spanish translators
21st-century Spanish novelists
20th-century translators
21st-century translators
People from Madrid
Academic staff of the Charles III University of Madrid
Academic staff of the University of Potsdam
Academic staff of the Complutense University of Madrid
Complutense University of Madrid alumni
20th-century Spanish male writers
21st-century Spanish male writers